P. utilis  may refer to:
 Pandanus utilis, the common screwpine, a tropical tree species native to Madagascar and Mauritius
 Procecidochares utilis, a fruit fly species

See also
 Utilis (disambiguation)